Euphaedra sangbae is a butterfly in the family Nymphalidae. It is found in the northern part of the Central African Republic.

References

Butterflies described in 1996
sangbae
Endemic fauna of the Central African Republic
Butterflies of Africa